Mostafa Ronaghi (born 1968) is an Iranian molecular biologist, specializing in DNA sequencing methodology. He earned his Ph.D. from the Royal Institute of Technology in Sweden in 1998.

, he is the Chief Technology Officer and Senior Vice President at Illumina. Prior to this position, he was a principal investigator and Senior Research Associate at the Stanford Genome Technology Center at Stanford University, focusing on developing analytical techniques for molecular diagnostics.

He is principal investigator for several grants including grants from the National Human Genome Research Institute (NHGRI), part of the National Institutes of Health for the development of array-based Pyrosequencing.

In 1998, he described together with Pål Nyren and Mathias Uhlen a solution-based variant of the pyrosequencing technology and co-founded Pyrosequencing AB (renamed to Biotage in 2003). He co-invented Molecular Inversion Probe assay and co-founded ParAllele BioScience to develop this multiplexed technology for genetic testing. ParAllele was acquired by Affymetrix in May 2005.
In 2005, he co-founded NextBio, a search engine for life science data that was acquired by Illumina in 2013. He also serves on the board of directors of IntegenX and Aurora Biofuels. In 2008, Ronaghi and Helmy Eltoukhy co-founded Avantome, a DNA sequencing company that was acquired by Illumina in July 2008.

Publications
Among his approximately 50 peer-reviewed journal articles are the publications describing Pyrosequencing and Molecular Inversion Probe assays and other techniques:
 
 
 
 
 
 

He also holds about 20 patents.

References

[Pyrosequencing Array for DNA Sequencing]

External links
 Stanford Genome Technology Center
 NextBio
 IntegenX, Inc.
 Aurora Biofuels

1968 births
Living people
KTH Royal Institute of Technology alumni
American people of Iranian descent
Iranian biologists
Iranian expatriate academics
Iranian chief technology officers